Nadezhda Vasilyevna Repina ( –  ) was a Russian actress and singer (soprano).

She was the daughter of a serf actor and musician in the troupe of a landlord called Stolypin,  who in 1798   sold him to the Imperial troupe. Serf actors, once in the Imperial troupe, immediately were free people. So Nadezhda was born free.

Vasily Repin became a musician in the orchestra of the Moscow Imperial troupe, and gave his daughter in 1816 at the Moscow Imperial theater college. Her musical and acting talent  were noticed right away.

She made her debut in several operas and vaudevilles in 1823.

At this time the Moscow Imperial troupe not had its theaters – they all  were burned. Performances were held in the homes of wealthy Muscovites. At the end of 1824, a rich merchant Vasily Vargin gave his house to the Moscow Imperial troupe  – now this is Maly Theatre (Moscow), it was opened on 14 October 1824.

At the same time, architects Andrei Mikhailov and Joseph Bové had built a new theatre on the place of the burnt theatre of Michael Maddox – now this is Bolshoi Theatre; it opened on 18 January 1825.

Nadezhda Repina became the first prima  donna these theaters. Her talent took all genres: opera, operetta, comedy, vaudeville, drama, tragedy.

Many playwrights  wrote leading roles for her  in their plays (Dmitry Lensky, Aleksander Pisarev). Sergei Aksakov called her the “adornment of the Moscow stage”.

She was especially successful in comedies and vaudevilles where her partner was the famous Russian actor Mikhail Shchepkin.

She was a pupil and then wife of the composer Alexey Verstovsky. He wrote his operas and musical vaudevilles for her.

Among Nadezhda Repina's roles:
 Masha – Ivan Susanin, opera of Catterino Cavos
 Zerlina – Don Giovanni, opera of Mozart
 Angèle – Le domino noir, opéra comique of Daniel Auber
 Yulia – Pan Tvardovsky, opera of Alexey Verstovsky
 Suzanne – The Marriage of Figaro, play of Pierre Beaumarchais
 Ophelia – Hamlet, play of William Shakespeare (1837; music author is a composer Alexander Egorovich Varlamov; Pavel Mochalov as Hamlet)
 Luise – Intrigue and Love, play of Friedrich Schiller
 Nadezhda – Askold's Grave, opera of Alexey Verstovsky
 Sofia – Woe from Wit, play of Alexander Griboyedov
 Liza – Lev Gurych Sinichkin, play of Dmitry Lensky (author's version of the plot of French play Le Père de la débutante of Jean-François Bayard and Emmanuel Théaulon), with music of Alexey Verstovsky
etc.

The repertoire of Nadezhda Repina was huge; she sang some 100 operatic roles, not counting roles in drama performances.

Alexey Verstovsky was not only a composer, he became the head of Music department at the Moscow Imperial troupe. He knew that  would be expected large changes and, fearing that they would affect to his wife,  asked without her knowledge to the Directorate for her dismissal.

She knew nothing about this. Her dismissal was held in 1841. When she heard of it, she fainted.

Nadezhda Repina and Alexey Verstovsky made the official church marriage. Her acting was over. She was 32 years old, still had many years of empty and useless life. From time to time, she continued to come backstage and helped councils of young actresses. But it was quite a different life. Her partner, actor S. Solovyov wrote that she was interested of only one thing: her acting, without it she could not live, and she was very grieved at her inaction.

Alexey Verstovsky died in their house in  Khlebny lane . She survived her husband for five years. She died in the same house .

One newspaper wrote the obituary: "With its leaving the Moscow scene suffered a great loss, and God knows when and by whom it will be recharged. At least, still a place of unforgettable actress remains vacant. True talents are not born, as mushrooms".

Notes

1809 births
1867 deaths
Russian operatic sopranos
19th-century women opera singers from the Russian Empire
19th-century actresses from the Russian Empire
Russian stage actresses